Thakurgaon-3 is a constituency represented in the Jatiya Sangsad (National Parliament) of Bangladesh since 2023 by Hafiz Uddin Ahmed of the Jatiya Party (Ershad).

Boundaries 
The constituency encompasses Pirganj Upazila, Ranisankail Municipality, and six union parishads of Ranisankail Upazila: Bachor, Hossain Gaon, Lehemba, Nonduar, Nekmarad, and Raton.

History 
The constituency was created in 1984 from the Dinajpur-5 constituency when the former Dinajpur District was split into three districts: Panchagarh, Thakurgaon, and Dinajpur.

Members of Parliament

Elections

Elections in the 2010s

Elections in the 2000s

Elections in the 1990s

References

External links
 

Parliamentary constituencies in Bangladesh
Thakurgaon District